A poetry collection is often a compilation of several poems by one poet to be published in a single volume or chapbook.  A collection can include any number of poems, ranging from a few (e.g. the four long poems in T. S. Eliot's Four Quartets) to several hundred poems (as is often seen in collections of haiku).  Typically the poems included in single volume of poetry, or a cycle of poems, are linked by their style or thematic material.  Most poets publish several volumes of poetry through the course of their life while other poets publish one (e.g. Walt Whitman's lifelong expansion of Leaves of Grass).

The notion of a "collection" differs in definition from volumes of a poet's "collected poems", "selected poems" or from a poetry anthology.  Typically, a volume entitled "Collected Poems" is a compilation by a poet or an editor of a poet's work that is often both published and previously unpublished, drawn over a set span of years of the poet's work, or the entire poet's life, that represents a more complete or definitive edition of the poet's work.  Comparatively, a volume titled "selected poems" often includes a small but not definitive selection of poems by a poet or editor drawn from several of the poet's collections.  A poetry anthology differs in concept because it draws together works from multiple poets chosen by the anthology's editor.

By title in alphabetical order
Because there is often confusion as to what constitutes a "collection", the list below only includes single volumes of poetry that were published at the direction of the author as a stand-alone collection and not any compiled editions of "collected works" or "selected works."

Titles: A–C

 A Boy's Will (1913) - Robert Frost
 A City Winter and Other Poems (1951) - Frank O'Hara
 "A Door Somewhere"" (2016)-Jaydeep Sarangi
 A Further Range (1936) - Robert Frost
 A Green Bough (1933) - William Faulkner
 A Lume Spento (1908) - Ezra Pound
 A Man in the Divided Sea (1946) - Thomas Merton
 A Quinzaine for This Yule (1908) - Ezra Pound
 A Remembrance Collection of New Poems (1959) - Robert Frost
 As I see it - A Poetry Collection (2015) - Rajith V. Embuldeniya
 A Witness Tree (1942) - Robert Frost
 About the House (1965) -- W.H. Auden
 Adam & Eve & The City (1936) - William Carlos Williams
 Adult Bookstore (1976) - Karl Shapiro
 Advent (1898) - Rainer Maria Rilke
 Aforesaid (1954) - Robert Frost
Agnibeena – Kazi Nazrul Islam
 Al Que Quiere! (1917) - William Carlos Williams
 An Early Martyr and Other Poems (1935) - William Carlos Williams
 Another Time (1940) -- W.H. Auden
Ariel - Sylvia Plath
Arogyo – Rabindranath Tagore  
Auguries of Innocence – Patti Smith
 Auto Wreck (1942) - Karl Shapiro
Babel – Patti Smith
Bairagi Kailaka Kabitaharu (1974) – Bairagi Kainla
Bana-Phul – Rabindranath Tagore  
 Basic Heart (2009) - Renée Ashley
Bhagna Hriday – Rabindranath Tagore
Bhanusimha Thakurer Padabali – Rabindranath Tagore  
 Blood for A Stranger (1942) - Randall Jarrell
 Book of Blues (1954–1961) - Jack Kerouac
 Book of Haikus (posthumous, 2003) - Jack Kerouac
Book of Psalms
 Book of Sketches (1952–1957) - Jack Kerouac
 Buah Rindu (1941) – Amir Hamzah
 Cables to the Ace (1968) - Thomas Merton
 Caedmon manuscript
 Canterbury Tales - Geoffrey Chaucer
 Canzoni (1911) - Ezra Pound
 The Cantos - Ezra Pound
 Cathay (1915) - Ezra Pound
Chaitali – Rabindranath Tagore 
Chhabi O Gan – Rabindranath Tagore  
 Child Whispers (1922) - Enid Blyton 
 Chills and Fever (1924) - John Crowe Ransom 
 Chiryaa, Titli, Phool - Tanwir Phool
Chitra – Rabindranath Tagore  
 Circling: 1978-1987 (2012) (trans. of Krugovanje: 1978-1987, 1993) - Dejan Stojanović
 City Without Walls and Other Poems (1969) -- W.H. Auden
 Clouds, Aigeltinger, Russia (1948) - William Carlos Williams
 Coda: Last Poems (posthumous, 2008) - Karl Shapiro
 Come In, and Other Poems (1943) - Robert Frost
 Collective Amnesia (2017) - Koleka Putuma
 Contention of the bards - infighting among the last of the Gaelic bards in 17thC. Ireland, as their order collapsed.
 Cosmopolitan Greetings Poems: 1986–1993 (1994) - Allen Ginsberg
 A Curious Collection of Cats (2009) - Betsy Franco

Titles: D–F
 Das Buch der Bilder (trans. The Book of Images) (1902–1906) - Rainer Maria Rilke
 Das Knaben Wunderhorn
 Das Stunden-Buch (trans. The Book of Hours) (1899-1903) - Rainer Maria Rilke
 Day by Day (1977) - Robert Lowell
 Death and Fame: Poems 1993–1997 (1999) - Allen Ginsberg
 Dhanu Dnyaniyaachi (2016) - Dhanashree Ganatra
 Dictee (1982) — Theresa Hak Kyung Cha
 Dramatic Lyrics — Robert Browning
 Dramatic Romances and Lyrics — Robert Browning
 Dramatis Personae — Robert Browning
 Duisener Elegien (trans. Duino Elegies) (1922) - Rainer Maria Rilke
 Dumb Instrument (1976) - Denton Welch
 Early Work – Patti Smith
Eclogues (c. 37 BCE) – Virgil (Publius Vergilius Maro)
 Edda, Elder Edda
 Emblems of a Season of Fury (1963) - Thomas Merton
 Empire of Dreams (1988) - Giannina Braschi
 Empty Mirror: Early Poems (1961) - Allen Ginsberg
 Epistle to a Godson and Other Poems (1972) -- W.H. Auden
 Exultations (1909) - Ezra Pound
 The Exeter Book
Feminine Gospels - Carol Ann Duffy (2002)
 First Blues: Rags, Ballads & Harmonium Songs 1971 - 1974 (1975) - Allen Ginsberg
 Fly by Night (1976) - Randall Jarrell
 For the Time Being (1944) -- W.H. Auden
 For the Union Dead (1964) - Robert Lowell
 Four Quartets (1943) – T. S. Eliot
 From Snow to Snow (1936) - Robert Frost

Titles: G–J

 Georgics (c. 29 BCE) – Virgil (Publius Vergilius Maro)
Ghumne Mechmathi Andho Manche (1969) – Bhupi Sherchan
Gitabitan – Rabindranath Tagore  
 Gitanjali (1910) – Rabindranath Tagore (also published in English as Song Offerings in 1912, for that Tagore received Nobel Prize in 1913)    
 Go Go (1923) - William Carlos Williams
 Goblin Market and Other Poems (1862) - Christina Rossetti
 Harmonium (1923) - Wallace Stevens
 Hazard and Prospect: New and Selected Poems (2007)Kelly Cherry
 Heaven and Other Poems (posthumous, 1977) - Jack Kerouac
 His Toy, His Dream, His Rest (1968) - John Berryman
 Homage to Clio (1960) -- W.H. Auden
 Homage to Sextus Propertius (1934) - Ezra Pound
 Homeric Hymns
 How to be Drawn (2015) - Terrance Hayes
 Howl and Other Poems (1956) - Allen Ginsberg
I Wrote This For You (2011) - Iain S. Thomas
 Ideas of Order (1936) - Wallace Stevens
 Idylls of the King – Alfred Tennyson
 Imaginations (posthumous, 1970) - William Carlos Williams
 Imitations (1961) - Robert Lowell
 In the Clearing (1962) - Robert Frost
 In the Seven Woods (1903) - W.B. Yeats
 is 5 (1926) - E. E. Cummings
 Jeevanko Chheubaata (trans. From the Bank of Life) -Suman Pokhrel
 Journey to a War (1939; verse and prose)
 Journey to Love (1955) - William Carlos Williams

Titles: K–M

Kabi-Kahini – Rabindranath Tagore
 Kaddish and Other Poems (1961) - Allen Ginsberg
Kari o Komal– Rabindranath Tagore
 Khushbu - Parveen Shakir
 Kytice (A Bouquet) – Karel Jaromír Erben
 Lamia, Isabella, The Eve of St Agnes and Other Poems (1820) - John Keats
 Land of Unlikeness (1944) - Robert Lowell
 Larenopfer (trans. Lares' Sacrifice) (1895) - Rainer Maria Rilke
 Leaves of Grass – Walt Whitman (1855-1891)
 Leben und Lieder (trans. Life and Songs) (1894) - Rainer Maria Rilke
 Les Fleurs du mal – Charles Baudelaire (1857)
 Letters from Iceland (1936, verse and prose) -- W.H. Auden
 Life Studies (1959) - Robert Lowell
 Little Friend, Little Friend (1945) - Randall Jarrell
 Look, Stranger! (1936) -- W.H. Auden
 Lord Weary's Castle (1946) - Robert Lowell
 Losses (1948) - Randall Jarrell
 lot of my sister (2001) - Alison Stine
 Love Poems (Tentative Title) (1965) - Frank O'Hara
 Lunch Poems (1964) - Frank O'Hara
 Lustra (1916) - Ezra Pound
 Lyrical Ballads, with a Few Other Poems (1798) – William Wordsworth and Samuel Taylor Coleridge
 Main Street and Other Poems (1917) - Joyce Kilmer
 Manasi – Rabindranath Tagore
 The Marriage of Heaven and Hell – William Blake 1790-1793 
 Meditations in an Emergency (1957) - Frank O'Hara
 Men and Women – Robert Browning
 Mexico City Blues (1959) - Jack Kerouac
 Michael Robartes and the Dancer (1921) - W.B. Yeats
 Mind Breaths (1978) - Allen Ginsberg
 Mississippi Poems (posthumous, 1979) - William Faulkner
Mohan Koiralaka Kavita (1973) – Mohan Koirala
 Monks Pond: No. 1, 1968 (1968) - Thomas Merton
 Monokuma's Poetry Collection (2012) - Monokuma
 Monolithos – Jack Gilbert
 Mother Goose (generic for collections of nursery rhymes)
 Mountain Interval (1916) - Robert Frost
 Muna Madan - Laxmi Prasad Devkota
 My Facebook Wall (2016) - Dhanashree Ganatra
 My Life (1980) - Lyn Hejinian

Titles: N–P
Nadi – Rabindranath Tagore 
 Near the Ocean (1967) - Robert Lowell
 Neue Gedichte (trans. New Poems) (1907) - Rainer Maria Rilke
 New Hampshire (1923) - Robert Frost
 Nones (1951) -- W.H. Auden
 No Thanks (1935) - E. E. Cummings
 North of Boston (1914) - Robert Frost
 Nyanyi Sunyi (1937) - Amir Hamzah
 Odes (1960) - Frank O'Hara
 Ohio Violence (2009) - Alison Stine
 Old Angel Midnight (posthumous, 1973) - Jack Kerouac
 Old Possum's Book of Practical Cats (1939) - T. S. Eliot
 Olney Hymns
 Opus Posthumous (posthumous, 1957) - Wallace Stevens
 Oranges: 12 pastorals (1953) - Frank O'Hara
 Our Lady Peace - Mark Van Doren
 Owl's Clover (1936) - Wallace Stevens
 Parts of a World (1942) - Wallace Stevens
 Paulicéia Desvairada (trans. "Untapped São Paulo" or "Hallucinated City") (1922) - Mário de Andrade
 Person, Place, and Thing (1942) - Karl Shapiro
 Personae (1908) - Ezra Pound
 Pictures from Brueghel and Other Poems (1962) - William Carlos Williams
 Pierrot Lunaire - Albert Giraud
 Place of Love (1943) - Karl Shapiro
 Plutonian Ode: Poems 1977–1980 (1981) - Allen Ginsberg
 Poems (1833) - Alfred, Lord Tennyson
 Poems (1842) - Alfred, Lord Tennyson
 Poems (1909) - William Carlos Williams
 Poems (1920) - T.S. Eliot
 Poems (1930) -- W.H. Auden
 Poems (1920) - Wilfred Owen
 Poems about God (1919) - John Crowe Ransom
 Poems All Sizes (posthumous, 1992) - Jack Kerouac
 Poems, Chiefly Lyrical (1830) - Alfred, Lord Tennyson
 Poems, in Two Volumes (1807) - William Wordsworth
 Poems of a Jew (1950) - Karl Shapiro
 Prabhat Samgiita (5018 songs) – Prabhat Ranjan Sarkar
Prabhat Sangeet – Rabindranath Tagore 
 Provenca (1910) - Ezra Pound
 Prufrock and Other Observations (1917) - T.S. Eliot

Titles: Q–S

 Quia Pauper Amavi (1908) - Ezra Pound
Ramprasadi (devotional songs) – Ramprasad Sen 
 Ripostes (1912) - Ezra Pound
 Rubaiyat - Omar Khayyám (trans. Edward Fitzgerald)
 Sad Dust Glories: poems during work summer in woods (1975) - Allen Ginsberg
Sagarmatha Ko Gahirai (2017) - Nawaraj Parajuli
 Salt (1992) - Renée Ashley
 San Francisco Blues (posthumous, 1991) - Jack Kerouac
Sandhya Sangeet – Rabindranath Tagore  
 Scattered Poems (posthumous, 1971) - Jack Kerouac
 Second Avenue (1960) - Frank O'Hara
 Self-portrait in a Convex Mirror (1975) - John Ashbery
 Seventh Heaven – Patti Smith
Shaishab Sangeet – Rabindranath Tagore  
 Shards of Crystal (book) - Fern G. Z. Carr
 A Shropshire Lad - A. E. Housman
 Silent Days (Cyberwit.net,2013)-Jaydeep Sarangi
 Skirrid Hill - Owen Sheers (2006)
Sonar Tari – Rabindranath Tagore  
 Songs of Experience - William Blake
 Songs of Innocence - William Blake
 Sonette an Orpheus (trans. Sonnets to Orpheus) (1922) - Rainer Maria Rilke
 Sonnets from the Portuguese - Elizabeth Barrett Browning
 Sounding the Seasons: Seventy Sonnets for Christian Year (Norwich: Canterbury Press, 2012) — Malcolm Guite 
 Sour Grapes (1921) - William Carlos Williams
 Spring and All (1923) - William Carlos Williams
 Spring Thunder (1924) - Mark Van Doren
 State of Love and Trust - W.K. Lawrence
 Steeple Bush (1947) - Robert Frost
 Summer of Love (1911) - Joyce Kilmer
 Svipdagsmál (Old Norse)

Titles: T–V
Tamerlane and Other Poems - Edgar Allan Poe
 Thank You, Fog: Last Poems (1974) -- W.H. Auden
 The Animal Family (1965) - Randall Jarrell
 The Antigone Poems (2014) - Marie Slaight
 The Auroras of Autumn (1950) - Wallace Stevens
 The Bat-Poet (1964) - Randall Jarrell
 The Bourgeois Poet (1964) - Karl Shapiro
 The Broken Span (1941) - William Carlos Williams
 The Cod Head (1932) - William Carlos Williams
 The Countess Kathleen and Various Legends and Lyrics (1892) - W.B. Yeats
 The Creator (2012) (trans. of Tvoritelj, 2000 ) - Dejan Stojanović
 The Cynic in Extremis (2018) - Jacob M. Appel
 The Desert Music and Other Poems (1954) - William Carlos Williams
 The Dolphin (1973) - Robert Lowell
 The Double Man (1941) -- W.H. Auden
 The Fall of America: Poems of These States (1973) - Allen Ginsberg
 The Fly (1942) - Karl Shapiro
 The Gates of Wrath: Rhymed Poems 1948–1951 (1972) - Allen Ginsberg
 The Geography of Lograire (posthumous, 1969) - Thomas Merton
 The Gingerbread Rabbit (1965) - Randall Jarrell
 The Gold Hesperidee (1935) - Robert Frost
The Legendary Graduate (2012) - Joseph D. Smith
 The Lone Striker (1933) - Robert Frost
 The Lost World (1965) - Randall Jarrell
 The Man with the Blue Guitar (1937) - Wallace Stevens
 The Marble Faun (1924) - William Faulkner
 The Mayfield Deer (1941) - Mark Van Doren
 The Mills of The Kavanaughs (1951) - Robert Lowell
 The Museum of Lost Wings (2006) - Renée Ashley
 The Old Horsefly (1993) - Karl Shapiro
 The Orators: An English Study (1932, verse and prose) -- W.H. Auden
 The Palm at the End of the Mind (posthumous, 1972) - Wallace Stevens
 The Pisan Cantos (1948) - Ezra Pound
 The Place of Love (1943) - Karl Shapiro
 The Princess: A Medley (1847) - Alfred, Lord Tennyson
 The Revisionist's Dream (2001) - Renée Ashley
 The Scripture of the Golden Eternity (1960) - Jack Kerouac
 The Seven League Crutches (1951) - Randall Jarrell
 The Seven Seas (1896) - Rudyard Kipling
 The Shape (2012) (trans. of Oblik, 2000 ) - Dejan Stojanović
 The Shield of Achilles (1955) -- W.H. Auden
 The Sign and Its Children (2012) (trans. of Znak i njegova deca, 2000 ) - Dejan Stojanović
 The Singing Bowl (Norwich: Canterbury Press, 2013) — Malcolm Guite 
 The Snow Man (1921) - Wallace Stevens
 The Story-Teller - Mark Van Doren
 The Strange Islands: Poems (1957) - Thomas Merton
 The Tears of the Blind Lions (1949) - Thomas Merton
 The Tempers (1913) - William Carlos Williams
 The Tower (1928) - W.B. Yeats
 The Various Reason of Light (1998) - Renée Ashley
 The Verbs of Desiring (2010) - Renée Ashley
 The Wanderings of Oisin and Other Poems - W. B. Yeats (1889)
 The Wedge (1944) - William Carlos Williams
 The Wild Swans at Coole (1919) - W.B. Yeats
 The Winding Stair and Other Poems (1933) - W.B. Yeats
 The Woman at the Washington Zoo: Poems and Translations (1960) - Randall Jarrell
 Thirty Poems (1944) - Thomas Merton
 Three Stories and Ten Poems - Ernest Hemingway
 Trees and Other Poems (1914) - Joyce Kilmer
To Square A Circle (2018) - T. K. Lee
 Transport to Summer (1947) - Wallace Stevens
 Traumgekrönt (trans. Dream-Crowned) (1897) - Rainer Maria Rilke
 Trial of a Poet (1947) - Karl Shapiro
 Tulips and Chimneys (1923) - E. E. Cummings
 Two Gentlemen in Bonds (1927) - John Crowe Ransom
 Umbra (1920) - Ezra Pound
 Vision in Spring (1921) - William Faulkner
 ViVa (1931) - E. E. Cummings
 V-Letter and Other Poems (1945) - Karl Shapiro

Titles: W–Z
 WAIT (2011) - Alison Stine
 West-Running Brook (1929) - Robert Frost
 White Haired Lover (1968) - Karl Shapiro
 White Shroud Poems: 1980–1985 (1986) - Allen Ginsberg
 Winter Diary (1935) - Mark Van Doren
 Witt – Patti Smith
 XAIPE: Seventy-One Poems (1950) - E. E. Cummings
 XLI Poems (1925) - E. E. Cummings
 You Come Too (1959) - Robert Frost

Titles beginning with numbers
 1 × 1 (1944) - E. E. Cummings
 50 Poems (1940) - E. E. Cummings
 73 Poems (1963) - E. E. Cummings (posthumous)
 77 Dream Songs (1964) - John Berryman
 95 Poems (1958) - E. E. Cummings
 108 Verges Until Now - Will Inman (Carlton Press, 1964)

Titles beginning with symbols
 & (1925) - E. E. Cummings

See also
 Anthology
 Glossary of poetry terms
 History of poetry
 List of anonymously published works
 List of poems
 List of poetry anthologies
 List of poetry groups and movements
 Lists of poets
 List of years in poetry
 List of years in literature
 Lists of books
 Outline of poetry
 Song cycle
 The Poetry Collection – a collection of 100,000 volumes of 20th century English-language poetry at the University of Buffalo

References

External links
 Bartleby.com - Verse: Poetry Anthologies and Tens of Thousands of Poems (includes several poetry collections)
 The Poetry Collection (at University of Buffalo libraries)

poetry collections, List of
 List of poetry collections
poetry collections, List of